This is a list of notable brothers of Phi Sigma Kappa men's collegiate fraternity, including those who were members of Phi Sigma Epsilon prior to the 1985 merger. See Talk page to review guidelines for inclusion.

Government

Science and research

Business, industry, and finance

Religion

Peter George Popoff

Entertainment and broadcasting

Civic leadership

Military
Note: Astronauts listed in Science and Research Section

Journalism and literature

Sports

Education

References

External links
 Phi Sigma Kappa – national website

brothers
Lists of members of United States student societies